The following is a list of pipeline accidents in the United States in 1979. It is one of several lists of U.S. pipeline accidents. See also: list of natural gas and oil production accidents in the United States.

Incidents 

This is not a complete list of all pipeline accidents. For natural gas alone, the Pipeline and Hazardous Materials Safety Administration (PHMSA), a United States Department of Transportation agency, has collected data on more than 3,200 accidents deemed serious or significant since 1987.

A "significant incident" results in any of the following consequences:
 Fatality or injury requiring in-patient hospitalization.
 $50,000 or more in total costs, measured in 1984 dollars.
 Liquid releases of five or more barrels (42 US gal/barrel).
 Releases resulting in an unintentional fire or explosion.

PHMSA and the National Transportation Safety Board (NTSB) post-incident data and results of investigations into accidents involving pipelines that carry a variety of products, including natural gas, oil, diesel fuel, gasoline, kerosene, jet fuel, carbon dioxide, and other substances. Occasionally pipelines are re-purposed to carry different products.

The following incidents occurred during 1979:
 A ruptured 2-inch gas line leaking caused a home to explode in Spokane, Washington on January 6, killing the homeowner.
 On January 16, an explosion and fire destroyed five commercial buildings and damaged several other buildings in London, Kentucky. Two persons were injured. External corrosion was suspected as the cause. A prearranged pressure increase in the pipeline was also a factor.
 On January 18 in Hocking County, Ohio a high pressure pipeline ruptured, killing a line repairman, and a supervisor.  6 other line repairman were also seriously injured.
 On February 7, a Colonial Pipeline stubline ruptured in Hamilton, Tennessee, spilling about 152,000 gallons of petroleum product. The cause was from improper backfill of soil around the pipeline during its construction.
 On March 2, at Alyeska Pipeline Service Company, Pump Station #6 located near the Yukon River in Alaska, the topping unit producing turbine fuel experienced a flame out of the flare stack which burns flammable tail gas from the unit.  Automatic ignition apparatus did not function due to the extreme low temperature of -25F.  A safety professional on staff was tasked with climbing the stack and re-igniting the flare manually.  Once ignition was established, and before the safety professional could climb down from the top catwalk platform, station management ordered the combustion blower to be turned on and tail gas pressure to be increased from 3psi to 11psi.  The action resulted in a surge through the knock out drum at the base of the stack, causing residual oil and naphtha to be blown up the stack, covering the top catwalk and approximately the top 60 feet of the stack in burning petroleum.  The safety professional was severely burned and fell through the stack main access ladder components and iron work 115 feet to the ground.  The occurrence did not result in a fatality, however, fire damaged the stack and petroleum contaminated the surrounding base area.
 On March 4, a natural gas pipeline exploded and burned, near West Chester, Iowa, ejecting a 40 foot long section of pipe. There were no injuries.
 An 18-inch natural gas transmission pipeline failed underneath the Florida Turnpike in West Palm Beach, Florida, resulting in a 2-hour road closure.
 On April 4, a dredge struck and ruptured a gas transmission pipeline, under Lake Pontchartrain, Louisiana. The gas ignited, seriously burning 3 of the crew of the dredge.
 On April 18, a 24-inch natural gas transmission pipeline pulled out of a compression coupling, during a line-lowering project under Iowa State Highway 181, in a rural area, near Dallas, Iowa. Two cars, a pickup truck, and a trailer housing construction equipment were destroyed. A backhoe was damaged and windows were broken in a nearby farmhouse. Five of the eight injured workers were hospitalized. The gas company's accident records indicated that this 24-inch pipeline had experienced 12 previous failures since it was constructed.
 On April 20, a series of explosions, and a fire, struck a Sunoco pipeline terminal in Toledo, Ohio. Some nearby residents fled their homes, and telephone service was disrupted.
 On May 11, 2 explosions and a following fire killed 7 people, injured 19 others, and destroyed 3 buildings in Philadelphia, Pennsylvania. Soil erosion under an 8-inch cast iron gas main caused the main to break and release gas.
 On May 13, a 36-inch Colonial Pipeline ruptured, releasing  of fuel oil that damaged vegetation, and killed fish, near Spartanburg, South Carolina. Cracks made in the railroad shipping of the pipe before installation were the cause.
 On May 19, tank truck drivers waiting at an Amoco terminal heard a bang, then saw a 3-foot side stream of gasoline pour down a nearby hillside in Pittsburgh, Pennsylvania. Train traffic on 2 nearby rail lines had to be stopped during the cleanup.
 A "spud" dropped by a pile driving barge in the Gulf of Mexico near Pilottown, Louisiana ruptured a 4-inch natural gas pipeline on June 5. The escaping gas ignited, and seriously burned the barge. 4 crew members went missing and were presumed dead.
 On June 10, the pilot of a helicopter reported sighting oil on the surface of the Atigun River near the route of the Trans-Alaska Pipeline System's 48-inch crude oil pipeline. Repair crews found a 7-inch crack which passed through a longitudinal weld. Five days after the first leak, at 3:15 p.m. on June 15, the pilot of an Alyeska helicopter on a routine surveillance flight reported a leak north of pump station No. 12 near the Little Tonsina River. A crack near a wrinkle in the pipe was found there. The spills were too small to be verified by the Alyeska metering system.
 A crack in a wrinkled section of the Trans-Alaska Pipeline System pipeline occurred at Pump Station 12 on June 15 on the south end of that pipeline in southern Alaska. About 1,000 barrels of crude oil were spilled.
 On June 16, operator error at Colonial Pipeline caused a prior to installation rail shipping induced crack of a 36-inch pipeline to rupture in Greenville County, South Carolina. 395,000 gallons of fuel oil were spilled, killing vegetation, fish, & wildlife in the area.
 A leaking pipeline released gasoline in Granger, Indiana, causing the evacuation of 400 people on July 3.
 An anchor handling boat, PETE TIDE II, damaged an unmarked gas pipeline with a grappling hook offshore from New Orleans, Louisiana. Two of the crew were missing and presumed dead in the fire that followed. (July 15, 1979)
 On July 25, an explosion and fire destroyed a duplex apartment house in Albuquerque, New Mexico. Two persons were killed, and two persons were hospitalized for burns; adjacent houses were damaged. Earlier in the day, a crew from Mountain Bell Telephone Company (Mountain Bell) had been using a backhoe at the intersection of Bridge Boulevard and Atrisco Road to locate a telephone cable. The backhoe snagged a gas service line but the fact that it was pulled from a 1-inch coupling under the house was not discovered at that time.
 A 34-inch Lakehead (now Enbridge) pipeline ruptured near Bemidji, Minnesota, leaking  of crude oil on August 20. The pipeline company initially recovered 60 percent of the spilled oil. Later in 1988, the Minnesota Pollution Control Agency required Lakehead to extract more oil using new technology; removal continued on, with studies still underway in the area.
 On August 20, a bulldozer operating near Orange, Texas, was being used to clean a farm drainage ditch. The corner of the blade cut into a propane line, which crossed beneath the ditch. Propane at 350 psig escaped and was ignited within seconds. The resulting fire killed one person, injured another, and caused considerable property damage.
 A crude oil pipeline ruptured and spilled oil into a creek new Walnut Grove, Missouri on August 25.  of the creek were contaminated, and 32,000 fish killed.
 On September 4, the M/V WHITEFACE struck a high-pressure gas pipeline on Lake Verret, near Pierre Part, Louisiana. A resulting explosion killed a crewman aboard the vessel.
 On October 6, an explosion caused by liquefied natural gas (LNG) vapors destroyed a transformer building at the reception facility of the Columbia LNG Corporation, Cove Point, Maryland. One person was killed, and one person was seriously injured. Damage to the facility was estimated at about $3 million. The fire hydrants and deluge water spray system were inoperable after the explosion because the water main that supplied the system was broken at a flange above ground inside the substation.
 On October 24, an explosion and fire destroyed the county clerk's office building and the adjoining courthouse building, gutted a connecting building which was under construction, and damaged the adjacent houses in Stanardsville, Virginia. Thirteen persons were injured and property was damaged extensively. The following NTSB investigation revealed that natural gas had leaked from a break in a 1 1/4-inch coated steel service line, which had been snagged by a backhoe which was being used to dig a footing for an addition to the county clerk's office building.
 On October 30, a natural gas explosion and fire demolished a townhouse in Washington, D.C., and damaged nearby buildings and cars. No one was inside the townhouse at the time, but three persons in a stopped car were injured when debris from the explosion shattered a car window. After the accident, an inspection of the gas service line that served the townhouse revealed that it had been struck by excavating equipment.
 On November 8, a pipeline contractor's ditching machine hit a 4-inch propane gathering line, in Sterling City, Texas. Propane under 500 psi escaped. Three hours later, a superintendent of the contractor attempted to start his pick up truck, located 650 feet from the leak. The starter of the truck ignited the propane, and the superintendent was severely burned, dying 40 days later. About 64,000 gallons of propane were lost or burned. No maps of the location of the pipeline ruptured were given to the contractor.
 A natural gas transmission pipeline exploded in West Monroe, Louisiana on November 11, causing 3 subdivisions to be evacuated, and creating a crater 70 feet wide and 20 feet deep. There were no injuries. A gas pipeline explosion had taken place nearby 8 years before.
 A 12-inch Amoco pipeline broke on December 11, near Waverly, Missouri, spilling about 8,400 gallons of crude oil. Temperature changes were blamed for the joint failure on the pipeline. 
 On December 16, military police at Marine Corps Base Quantico discovered fuel oil leaking into the Potomac River, near Chopawamsic Island. A leaking Plantation Pipeline 12 inch pipeline was the source, spilling between 5,000 and 10,000 gallons of fuel oil.

References

Lists of pipeline accidents in the United States